Adolfo Aldana Torres (born 5 January 1966) is a Spanish former professional footballer who played as a right midfielder.

Over 11 seasons, he amassed La Liga totals of 178 matches and 31 goals, mainly with Real Madrid and Deportivo with which he won a total of nine major titles.

Club career
Aldana was born in San Roque, Cádiz, Andalusia. Brought through the ranks of La Liga powerhouse Real Madrid, he found opportunities hard to come by, as he was mainly barred in the starting XI by legendary club player Míchel. However, he still managed to produce with limited playing time at the Merengues – for instance, in the 1989–90 season, in a final league title, he scored five goals in only 13 matches – and left Real with over 100 overall appearances, a departure which coincided with the signing of Sporting de Gijón's Luis Enrique.

Aldana signed with up-and-coming Deportivo de La Coruña in 1992, and reached international status at the Galicians while an instrumental figure in the side's lineups, partnering Fran and Mauro Silva in midfield. A serious knee injury would also leave him out of action for the entirety of his second year.

Aldana closed out his career with two years at RCD Espanyol (which included another campaign away from the pitches due to physical problems) and one with CP Mérida (second division), retiring at the age of 33.

International career
Aldana earned four caps for Spain during a one-year span. His debut came on 24 February 1993 in a 1994 FIFA World Cup qualifier against Lithuania, at Seville: brought from the bench he scored the last goal in a 5–0 success, but his injury at Deportivo eventually prevented a possible selection for the final stages.

After obtaining his coaching degree, Aldana eventually became manager of the Andalusia autonomous team. His first match in charge was on 27 December 2007, in a 4–1 friendly win over Zambia at the Estadio Municipal de Chapín.

International goal
Score and result list Spain's goal tally first, score column indicates score after Aldana goal.

Honours
Real Madrid
La Liga: 1987–88, 1988–89, 1989–90
Copa del Rey: 1988–89
Supercopa de España: 1989, 1990

Deportivo
Copa del Rey: 1994–95
Supercopa de España: 1995

References

External links
 
 Deportivo archives
 
 
 

1966 births
Living people
Spanish footballers
Footballers from San Roque, Cádiz
Association football midfielders
La Liga players
Segunda División players
Real Madrid Castilla footballers
Real Madrid CF players
Deportivo de La Coruña players
RCD Espanyol footballers
CP Mérida footballers
Spain under-21 international footballers
Spain international footballers
Spanish football managers